Fairview is a census-designated place (CDP) in Walker County, Georgia, United States. In the 2020 census, the population was 6,409. It is part of the Chattanooga, TN–GA Metropolitan Statistical Area.

Geography

Fairview is located at  (34.934700, -85.288546).

Demographics

2020 census

As of the 2020 United States census, there were 6,409 people, 2,439 households, and 1,715 families residing in the CDP.

2000 census
At the 2000 census, there were 6,601 people, 2,568 households and 1,931 families residing in the CDP. The racial makeup of the CDP was 92.56% White, 5.18% African American, 0.35% Native American, 0.48% Asian, 0.02% Pacific Islander, 0.24% from other races, and 1.17% from two or more races. Hispanic or Latino of any race were 0.68% of the population.

There were 2,568 households, of which 31.0% had children under the age of 18 living with them, 59.2% were married couples living together, 12.2% had a female householder with no husband present, and 24.8% were non-families. 22.0% of all households were made up of individuals, and 9.9% had someone living alone who was 65 years of age or older.  The average household size was 2.57 and the average family size was 3.00.

24.3% of residents were under the age of 18, 8.9% from 18 to 24, 28.0% from 25 to 44, 24.8% from 45 to 64, and 14.0% who were 65 years of age or older. The median age was 38 years. For every 100 females, there were 92.6 males. For every 100 females age 18 and over, there were 88.8 males.

The median household income was $33,894 and the median family income was $40,379. Males had a median income of $30,015 versus $22,155 for females. The per capita income for the CDP was $15,687. About 7.2% of families and 8.8% of the population were below the poverty line, including 11.8% of those under age 18 and 10.1% of those age 65 or over.

References

Census-designated places in Georgia (U.S. state)
Census-designated places in Walker County, Georgia
Chattanooga metropolitan area